The Meger Heli-Star is a homebuilt helicopter developed in 1969.

Design and development
The Heli-star is a two place, three rotor helicopter with tricycle landing gear, using modified Enstrom F-28 helicopter rotor blades, gearbox and tail boom. The helicopter can be flown from either seat with dual controls. It was designed by Mike Meger, flight director of Enstrom.  The fuselage splits open at the windshield line, sliding forward for access. The helicopter was demonstrated with the front section slid open in flight.

Specifications (Meger Heli-Star)

See also

References

Helicopters
Homebuilt aircraft